Balzapamba is a location in San Miguel Canton, Bolívar Province, Ecuador. The Inape balzapamba moth is named for this area.

References

Populated places in Bolívar Province (Ecuador)